Gu Shiwen (born May 1944) is a Chinese educator and physicist. He previously served as president of Central China Normal University from 2001 to 2003, and president of Hunan University between 2003 and 2005.

Gu is a member of the China Railway Society and Chinese Signal Processing Society.

Biography
Gu was born and raised in Yuyao, Zhejiang. He entered Beijing Jiaotong University in 1963, majoring in communication science, where he graduated in 1967. From 1967 to 1978 he worked in Liuzhou Railway Bureau. Beginning in 1978, he served in several posts in the School of Railway of Central South University, he was deputy dean in 1989, and four years later promoted to the dean position. In 2000 he was vice-president of Central South University, one year later, he was transferred to Wuhan, capital of Hubei province, and appointed the president of Central China Normal University. He became the president of Hunan University in April 2003, and held that office until July 2005.

References

External links

1944 births
People from Yuyao
Living people
Beijing Jiaotong University alumni
Presidents of Hunan University
Presidents of Central China Normal University